The 13th Anugerah Planet Muzik awards was held on October 17, 2014 at the Suntec, Singapore. The awards recognized the most popular artists and songs of 2014.

Performances

2014 music awards
Malaysian music awards